This is a list of sovereign states and dependent territories of the world by continent, displayed with their respective national flags, including the following entities:

 By association within the UN system:
 The 193 United Nations member states (UN).
 By Other States
 Generally this contains states with limited recognition and associated states not members of the United Nations
 Partially recognised de facto sovereign states without UN membership, such as the Republic of Kosovo and the Republic of China (Taiwan)
 De facto sovereign states lacking general international recognition
 Cook Islands and Niue, two states in free association with New Zealand without UN membership
 By Dependent Territories of other UN member states:
 Generally this contains non-sovereign territories that are recognized by the UN as part of some member state.
 Dependent territories.
 Other territories often regarded as separate geographical territories even though they are integral parts of their mother countries (such as the overseas departments and regions of France).

This list divides the world using the seven-continent model, with islands grouped into adjacent continents. Variations on are noted below and discussed in the following articles: Continent, Boundaries between the continents of Earth, and List of transcontinental countries.

Legend

Africa 

For a table of sovereign states and dependent territories in Africa with geographical data such as area, population, and population density, see Africa: territories and regions.

Geologically, Africa is connected to Eurasia by the Isthmus of Suez and forms part of Afro-Eurasia.

Transcontinental country in Europe and Africa, classified as a Western European country by the United Nations Statistics Division:  (Mayotte, and Réunion).
Transcontinental country in Asia and Africa, classified as a Western Asian country by the United Nations Statistics Division:  (Socotra).

Asia 

For a table of sovereign states and dependent territories in Asia with geographical data such as area, population, and population density, see Asia: territories and regions.

Geologically, Asia is part of Eurasia and due to the Isthmus of Suez forms part of Afro-Eurasia.

Transcontinental country in Africa and Asia, classified as a Northern African country by the United Nations Statistics Division:  (Sinai).
Transcontinental country in Europe and Asia, classified as an Eastern European country by the United Nations Statistics Division:  (North Asia).
Entirely in Southeast Asia, but commonly associated with Oceania, and lying east of the biogeographical Wallace Line: .
Transcontinental country in Europe and Asia, classified as a Southern European country by the United Nations Statistics Division:  (Kastellorizo, Strongyli Megistis, Ro, and other islands in North Aegean and South Aegean).
Transcontinental country in Asia and North America, classified as a Northern American country by the United Nations Statistics Division:  (Little Diomede Island, Near Islands, and St. Lawrence Island).

Europe 

For a table of sovereign states and dependent territories in Europe with geographical data such as area, population, and population density, see Europe: political geography.

Geologically, Europe is part of Eurasia and due to the Isthmus of Suez forms part of Afro-Eurasia.

North America 

For a table of sovereign states and dependent territories in North America with geographical data such as area, population, and population density, see North America: countries and territories.

Geologically, North America is joined with South America by the Isthmus of Panama to form the Americas.

Oceania 

For a table of sovereign states and dependent territories in Oceania with geographical data such as area, population, and population density, see Oceania: territories and regions.

Transcontinental country in Asia and Oceania, classified as an Eastern Asian country by the United Nations Statistics Division:  (Ogasawara [also known as the Bonin Islands or as the Nanpō Islands]).
Transcontinental country in Asia and Oceania, classified as a Southeastern Asian country by the United Nations Statistics Division:  (Maluku Islands and Western New Guinea).
Entirely in Southeast Asia, but commonly associated with Oceania, and lying east of the biogeographical Wallace Line: .
Transcontinental country in North America and Oceania, classified as a Northern American country by the United Nations Statistics Division:  (Hawaii).

South America 

For a table of sovereign states and dependent territories in South America with geographical data such as area, population, and population density, see South America: demographics.

Geologically, South America is joined with North America by the Isthmus of Panama to form the Americas.

Transcontinental country in North America and South America, classified as a Central American country by the United Nations Statistics Division:  (South East Panama).

Antarctica 

Antarctica is regulated by the Antarctic Treaty System, which defines it as all land and ice shelves south of 60°S, and has no government and belongs to no country. However, the following territorial claims in Antarctica have been made:
 Argentina: Argentine Antarctica
 Australia: Australian Antarctic Territory
 Chile: Chilean Antarctic Territory
 France: Adélie Land (part of the French Southern and Antarctic Lands)
 New Zealand: Ross Dependency
 Norway: Peter I Island and Queen Maud Land
 United Kingdom: British Antarctic Territory
 Terra nullius: Marie Byrd Land (unclaimed territory)

Russia and the United States have reserved the right to claim territory on Antarctica.

Subantarctic islands 
Unlike Antarctica itself, other nearby Subantarctic island territories most commonly associated with the Antarctic continent, but lying north of 60°S, have had full sovereignty established over them by a governing state.

The following dependent territories are situated within in the wider Antarctic region, but are not directly part of the Antarctic Treaty System:

In addition to the dependent territories listed above, the following islands are governed as a direct part of a controlling state. Thus they are fully and legally integrated within the governance structure of the respective state. They are similarly also not part of the Antarctic Treaty System.

See also
 Boundaries between the continents of Earth
 Continental union
 Gallery of dependent territory flags
 Gallery of sovereign state flags
 List of countries and inhabited areas
 List of countries by United Nations geoscheme
 List of dependent territories
 List of sovereign states
 List of sovereign states and dependent territories by continent (data file) — this data in a plain text format suitable for automated processing
 List of transcontinental countries

Notes

References

External links
 UN List of Territories
 CIA – The World Factbook
 U.S. Department of State: Background notes
 European Commission: List of countries, territories and currencies
 Administrative Divisions of Countries ("Statoids")
 World Population Review: List of countries by continent
 

 
Dependent territories
Eurasia
Africa
Americas
Oceania